Wakool County is one of the 141 Cadastral divisions of New South Wales. The main geographic feature of the county is the Wakool River. The county contains the towns of Barham, Moulamein, Wakool and Kyalite.

The name Wakool is believed to be derived from a local Aboriginal word.

Parishes within this county
A full list of parishes found within this county; their current LGA and mapping coordinates to the approximate centre of each location is as follows:

References

Counties of New South Wales